Jeppener is a town in Brandsen Partido in Buenos Aires Province, Argentina.

Population 
According to the last census the population count was 2,142 which represents an increase of 26.7% over 1,691 the previous census.

External links 

 Coord and NASA, Google images

Populated places in Buenos Aires Province